Carié is a municipality located in the Brazilian state of Alagoas. Its population is 17,719 (2020) and its area is 572 km².

References

Municipalities in Alagoas